The 2013 FIM New Zealand Speedway Grand Prix was the first race meeting of the 2013 Speedway Grand Prix season. It took place on 23 March at the Western Springs Stadium in Auckland, New Zealand.

The Grand Prix was won by Jarosław Hampel, who beat former champions Tomasz Gollob, Nicki Pedersen and Greg Hancock in the final. Although Hampel won the event, Gollob left New Zealand as the championship leader.

Riders 

The Speedway Grand Prix Commission nominated Jason Bunyan as the event Wild Card, and Sean Mason and Dale Finch as Track Reserves. The Draw was made on March 22.

Results

Details

By heat 
 Gollob, Woffinden, Žagar, Kasprzak
 Hancock, Holder, Iversen, Bunyan
 Ward, Vaculík, Hampel, Pedersen
 Jonsson, Lindgren, Lindbaeck, Sayfutdinov
 Hancock, Jonsson, Gollob, Pedersen
 Sayfutdinov, Woffinden, Bunyan, Vaculík
 Ward, Holder, Lindgren, Žagar
 Kasprzak, Iversen, Hampel, Lindbaeck
 Gollob, Lindbaeck, Ward, Bunyan
 Hampel, Lindgren, Hancock, Woffinden
 Pedersen, Iversen, Žagar, Sayfutdinov
 Jonsson, Kasprzak, Vaculík, Holder
 Holder, Hampel, Sayfutdinov, Gollob
 Woffinden, Jonsson, Ward, Iversen (F4x)
 Lindbaeck, Vaculík, Hancock, Žagar
 Pedersen, Lindgren, Kasprzak, Bunyan (Fx)
 Gollob, Iversen, Lindgren, Vaculík
 Pedersen, Woffinden, Holder, Lindbaeck
 Žagar, Hampel, Jonsson, Bunyan
 Ward, Sayfutdinov, Hancock, Kasprzak
 Semifinals:
 Hampel, Pedersen, Ward, Woffinden
 Gollob, Hancock, Holder, Jonsson
 fhe Final
 Hampel, Gollob, Pedersen, Hancock

Standings after the event

References

See also 
 motorcycle speedway

New Zealand
2013
Speedway